Churchill ministry may refer to:

 Churchill war ministry, the British coalition government led by Winston Churchill from 1940 to 1945
 Churchill caretaker ministry, the British coalition government led by Winston Churchill from May to July 1945
 Third Churchill ministry, the British majority government led by Sir Winston Churchill from 1951 to 1955

See also
 Premiership of Winston Churchill (disambiguation)
 War ministry (disambiguation)